Pinar del Rey is a station on Line 8 of the Madrid Metro. It is located in fare Zone A.

References 

Line 8 (Madrid Metro) stations
Railway stations in Spain opened in 2007
Buildings and structures in Hortaleza District, Madrid